"Crash and Burn Girl" was the fourth single to be released from Swedish pop singer-songwriter Robyn's 2005 self-titled album. It was released as a promotional single in Sweden only.

Track listings

Scandavian single
CD promo
"Crash and Burn Girl" – 3:35

Sweden single
CD promo
"Crash and Burn Girl" (Jesper Dahlbäck Remix) – 5:38
"Crash and Burn Girl" (Cat5 Remix) – 5:41

Music video
The music video for "Crash and Burn Girl" features Robyn heading down the stairs in a grey hoodie and shades before beginning to dance in an underground night club. The video is filmed with a night vision camera which was held by Robyn while she danced.

Personnel
Music and lyrics by Robyn and Klas Åhlund.
Produced by Klas Ahlund.
Violin performed by Orjan Hogberg.
Viola performed by Malio Ny-Nilsson.
Mixed by Ollie Olson och Henrik Edenhed for Mix Inc., Robyn and Klas Åhlund at Ljundhavet Studios.
Published by Madhouse/BMG Music Publishing.

2005 singles
Robyn songs
Songs written by Klas Åhlund
Songs written by Robyn
Nu-disco songs
2005 songs